Creation is a box set by Australian singer songwriter Archie Roach. The box set features remastered versions of Roach's first four studio albums with Mushroom Records between 1990 and 2002 with 14 previously unreleased bonus tracks and deluxe packaging including detailed liner notes, commentary from the albums' producers Paul Kelly, David Bridie, Malcolm Burn and Richard Pleasance. The album was released to coincide with the premiere of Roach's new live show, also entitled Creation which ran for three dates in October 2013 at the inaugural Boomerang Festival in Byron Bay. Additional dates for Creation were added for 20 and 21 June 2014 in Adelaide.

Roach told the Cairns Post performing the songs of Creation helps him remember the impact his music has had. “I think you realise (the songs) have actually grown through the years. I haven’t performed them for a little while, so they are quite fresh and new for me again. I think I interpret them in a different way now, they’ve had a chance to mature a bit.”

Track listing

Release history

References

2013 albums
Festival Records albums
Archie Roach albums